In mathematics, the affine q-Krawtchouk polynomials  are a family of basic hypergeometric orthogonal polynomials in the basic Askey scheme, introduced by Carlitz and Hodges.  give a detailed list of their properties.

Definition

The  polynomials are given in terms of basic hypergeometric functions by

Relation to other polynomials

affine q-Krawtchouk polynomials → little q-Laguerre polynomials：

 .

References

Orthogonal polynomials
Q-analogs
Special hypergeometric functions